Jacob ter Veldhuis (born 14 November 1951), also known as Jacob TV, is a Dutch avant-garde classical composer, born in Westerlee. Ter Veldhuis favors tonal, melodic compositions: ‘I pepper my music with sugar,’ he says. Many of his works build melodies around samples of the human voice, as in Steve Reich's composition 'Different Trains'. Some of his works have been performed by the New York string quartet ETHEL.

Significant works
 Heartbreakers (1999)-- based on samples from American television talk shows
 Paradiso (2001)-- video oratorio, 72 minutes, based on Dante's Paradiso
 Grab It! (1999)-- for tenor saxophone and soundtrack, based on samples from the documentary 'Scared Straight.'

References

Web page of Jacob TV
 Dutch composer samples pop culture and gives it a melody, New York Times, May 4, 2007.

1951 births
Living people
Dutch male classical composers
Dutch classical composers
People from Oldambt (municipality)